The Coconut Revolution is a 2001 multi-award winning documentary film about the struggle of the indigenous peoples of Bougainville Island during the Bougainville Civil War. The movement is described as the "world's first successful eco-revolution" and has drawn parallels with the conflict depicted in the 2009 film, Avatar.

Overview 

The movie tells the story of the successful uprising of the indigenous peoples of Bougainville Island against the Papua New Guinea army and the mining plans of the mining corporation Rio Tinto Zinc (RTZ) to exploit their natural resources. The documentary reveals how the Bougainville Revolutionary Army (BRA) managed to overcome the marine blockade strategy used by the Papuan army by using coconut oil as fuel for their vehicles.

It received funding from the Open Society Foundations, which thence became the Sundance Film Fund.

Awards
Awards attributed to this documentary include:

Winner
 Grand Prize, FICA Festival of Environmental Film, Brazil
 British Environment and Media (BEMA) Awards Richard Keefe Memorial Award - WWF
 Golden Kite, Best Documentary, Mar del Plata, Argentina
 Silver Kite, Best Film for Young People, Argentina

Runner-up
 BEMA Best Documentary
Amnesty International UK Media Awards 2001, Best Documentary
 One World Media Awards 2001, TV Documentary

See also

 Bougainville – Our Island Our Fight
 Amazonia for Sale

References

External links

 The Coconut Revolution Documentary - Friends of Peoples Close to Nature page
 Coconut Revolution, The (Bougainville story) on video

2001 documentary films
British documentary films
Documentary films about politics
Documentary films about war
Documentary films about indigenous rights
Separatism in Papua New Guinea
2001 films
Films shot in Papua New Guinea
Documentary films about Papua New Guinea
Environmental films
2000s English-language films
2000s British films